Sabak may refer to:

 Paolo Sabak (born 1999), Belgian footballer
 Sabak, Selangor, principal town of Sabak Bernam district in the state of Selangor, Malaysia
 Sabak, Silifke, a village in the district of Silifke, Mersin Province, Turkey
 Sabak (film), a Hindi film of 1973